Films produced in Sri Lanka in the 1990s.

1990

1991

1992

1993

1994

1995

1996

1997

1998

1999

References

See also
 Cinema of Sri Lanka
 List of Sri Lankan films

1990s
Films
Sri Lanka